Atalya may refer to:

 Atalyā, wife of Sargon II
 Atalya Slater, in America's Next Top Model

See also
 Athaliah, queen consort of Judah as the wife of King Jehoram, a descendant of King David, and later queen regnant c. 841–835 BCE
 Attalia (disambiguation)
 Atalaya (disambiguation)